This is a chronological list of Australian films by decade and year for years 1890s-1910s. For a complete alphabetical A-Z list, see :Category:Australian films.
A list of films produced in Australia by year, from the 1890s to the end of the 1910s, in the List of Australian films.

Pre 1910s

External links
 Australian film at the Internet Movie Database
 Marius Sestier Lumière Catalogue

 
 
1890s
Lists of 1890s films
Films
Lists of 1900s films
Films